Paradise is the sixteenth studio album by American country music artist John Anderson. It was released in 1996 under the BNA Records label. The album produced the singles: "Paradise" (also recorded by Pirates of the Mississippi on their 1995 album Paradise), which peaked at 26 on United States Country charts and 21 on Canadian charts, "Long Hard Lesson Learned", which peaked at 51 and "My Kind of Crazy", which peaked at 67.

Critical reception
Sara Sytsma of Allmusic rated the album two-and-a-half stars out of five, saying that it "featur[es] a handful of great songs that cancel out the fair amount of filler on the record." Chet Flippo of Billboard called it "traditional, uncompromising John Anderson country".

Track listing

Personnel
As listed in liner notes.
John Anderson – acoustic guitar, lead vocals, background vocals
Eddie Bayers – drums
Mike Brignardello – bass guitar
Larry Byrom – acoustic guitar
Darel DeCounter – Hammond B-3 organ
Paul Franklin – steel guitar, Dobro
Sonny Garrish – steel guitar, Dobro
Levon Helm – background vocals on "The Band Plays On"
Dann Huff – electric guitar
Mark Knopfler – electric guitar on "Let the Guitar Do the Talkin'"
Matt Rollings – piano
John Wesley Ryles – background vocals
Gary Smith – piano
Joe Spivey – fiddle, mandolin
Biff Watson – acoustic guitar
Lonnie Wilson – drums
Glenn Worf – bass guitar
Curtis Wright – background vocals
Curtis Young – background vocals

Chart performance

Album

Singles

References

1996 albums
BNA Records albums
John Anderson (musician) albums
Albums produced by James Stroud